Jomo Kwame Sundaram (born 1 December 1952), fondly known just as Jomo, is a prominent Malaysian economist. He is a senior adviser at the Khazanah Research Institute, visiting fellow at the Initiative for Policy Dialogue, Columbia University, and an adjunct professor at the International Islamic University (IIUM).

Education 
Jomo spent his early years studying at Westlands Primary School (1959–63), the Penang Free School (1964–66) and the Royal Military College (1967–70), when he was selected as Malaysia's delegate to the World Youth Forum in 1970.

After graduating cum laude from Yale with a major in economics, Jomo went to the Harvard Kennedy School at Harvard University and received his MPA in 1974 and then his PhD, before returning to teach in Malaysia at the Science University of Malaysia (USM). Jomo then returned to Harvard to complete his doctorate in late 1977 while teaching at Yale, after earlier teaching stints at Harvard during 1974 and 1975 in the economics department, the social studies program and the Kennedy Institute of Politics. In mid-1982, Jomo moved to the University of Malaya, where he remained until 2004. He was a British Academy Visiting Professor and later visiting fellow at Cambridge (1987–88, 1991–92), Fulbright Visiting Professor at Cornell University (1993) and visiting senior research fellow at the Asia Research Institute, National University of Singapore (2004).

Career and UN works 
Jomo was the founder-director of the Independent Institute of Social Analysis (INSAN) (1978–2004), editor of the monthly bilingual magazine, Nadi Insan (Human Pulse) (1979–1983), president of the Malaysian Social Science Association (1996–2000) and the convenor of the first and second International Malaysian Studies Conventions (1997, 1999). He was the founder chair (2001–2004) of International Development Economics Associates and has also served on the board of the United Nations Research Institute on Social Development, Geneva.

Before joining the UN, Jomo was already recognized as an outspoken intellectual, with unorthodox non-partisan views. Before the Asian financial crisis in 1997–98, Jomo was an early advocate of appropriate new capital account management measures, which then prime minister Mahathir Mohamad later introduced. When then deputy prime minister Anwar Ibrahim was imprisoned without trial under the Internal Security Act, Jomo publicly condemned the repression. In late 1998, he was sued for defamation for 250 million ringgit by Vincent Tan, a Mahathir era billionaire, who later dropped the case after almost a decade.

Jomo was also a member of the National Economic Consultative Council during 1989–1991 when he worked on post-New Economic Policy or post-1990 policy reform proposals. Since the 1970s, he has worked with government ministries, business organisations, trade unions, and civil society organisations. Since the 1980s, he has also worked with many international organisations.

While at the United Nations' Department of Economic and Social Affairs, Jomo led the response to the 2005 Summit call to help Member States develop national development strategies to achieve the internationally agreed development goals, while promoting their greater coherence as the United Nations Development Agenda. Jomo has tried to ensure greater UN system-wide collaboration in report preparation including the annual World Economic and Social Survey and biennial Report on the World Social Situation.

Jomo was also a Research Coordinator for the G24 Intergovernmental Group on International Monetary Affairs and Development during 2006–2012. During 2008–2009, he served as adviser to Father Miguel d'Escoto Brockmann, president of the 63rd United Nations General Assembly. Together with the Bank of International Settlements, the UN and the G24 – under his leadership – have been acknowledged as the only international organizations who warned of the impending 2007–2009 crisis. In response to the crisis, he initiated the UN system-wide supplementary Macroeconomic Advisory Capacity to offer 'second opinions' on appropriate policy responses emphasizing economic recovery and employment generation, served as a member of the Stiglitz Commission of Experts of the president of the UN General Assembly on Reforms of the International Monetary and Financial System during 2008–2009, and led a parallel effort for the G24 to articulate international financial system reform proposals.

Jomo served as the United Nations assistant secretary-general for economic development in the United Nations Department of Economic and Social Affairs (DESA) during 2005–2012, and then as assistant director-general and coordinator for economic and social development at the Food and Agriculture Organization of the United Nations in Rome during 2012–2015. From 2010 until he departed UN DESA, he served as the G20 'sherpa' to UN Secretary-General Ban Ki-Moon besides serving as G20 finance deputy for the UN since 2011. In these different capacities, he has worked to build an international consensus to ensure UN system-wide coherence, complementary economic and social policies for balanced and sustainable development, appropriate investment incentives, employment generation and, more recently, a strong and sustained economic recovery.

Jomo has addressed ministerial meetings of UNCTAD, most UN regional commissions, Funds and Programmes, several UN agencies as well as ECOSOC and the General Assembly's Second, Third and Fifth Committees as well as the World Economic Forum (Davos), Global Policy Forum (Yaroslavl), World Public Forum (Rhodos), World Social Forum (Porto Alegre) and many academic, business, and civil society conferences.

Malaysia Council of Eminent Persons and Economic Action Council 
In the aftermath of 2018 Malaysian general election (GE14) which saw a change of government, Jomo was appointed one of the five-member Council of Eminent Persons to advise the new Pakatan Harapan (PH)'s Federal Government and members Economic Action Council (EAC) chaired by the new Prime Minister Mahathir Mohamad later on 11 February 2019

Publications
Jomo is a leading scholar and expert on the political economy of development, especially in Southeast Asia, who has authored or edited over a hundred books and translated 12 volumes besides writing many academic papers and articles for the media.  He holds the Tun Hussein Onn Chair in International Studies at the Institute of Strategic and International Studies, Malaysia, was founder chair of International Development Economics Associates (IDEAs), and sat on the board of the United Nations Research Institute For Social Development (UNRISD), Geneva. He is on the editorial boards of several learned journals and has received several honours and awards for his work including the 2007 Wassily Leontief Prize for Advancing the Frontiers of Economic Thought.

His extensive writings have covered development economics, international economics, industrial policy, privatisation, rent-seeking corruption, economic liberalisation, economic distribution, affirmative action, ethnic relations, Islam, and Malaysian history. Jomo has authored or edited over a hundred books and translated a dozen volumes besides writing many academic papers and articles for the media. Some of his better known books include A Question of Class, Privatizing Malaysia, Southeast Asia's Misunderstood Miracle, Tigers in Trouble, Malaysia's Political Economy, Rents, Rent-Seeking and Economic Development, Malaysian Eclipse, The New Development Economics, Flat World, Big Gaps, Reforming the International Financial System for Development, Poor Poverty and Good Governance for What?

Bibliography

Monographs
Development and Population: Critique of Existing Theories. (1982)
Early Labour: Children at Work on Malaysian Plantations. (with Josie Zaini, P. Ramasamy and Sumathy Suppiah) (1984)
A Question of Class: Capital, the State and Uneven Development in Malaya. (1988)
Development Policies and Income Inequality in Peninsular Malaysia. (with Ishak Shari) (1986)Mahathir's Economic Policies. (with others) (1989)Beyond 1990: Considerations for a New National Development Strategy. (1989)Beyond the New Economic Policy? Malaysia in the Nineties. (1990)Growth and Structural Change in the Malaysian Economy. (1990)The Way Forward? The Political Economy of Development Policy Reform in Malaysia. (1993)Trade Unions and the State in Peninsular Malaysia. (with Patricia Todd) (1994)U-Turn? Malaysian Economic Development Policies After 1990. (1994)Southeast Asia's Misunderstood Miracle: Industrial Policy and Economic Development in Thailand, Malaysia and Indonesia. (with others) (1997)Malaysia's Political Economy: Politics, Patronage and Profits. (with E.T. Gomez) (1999)Economic Considerations for a Renewed Nationalism. (1998)Economic Diversification and Primary Commodity Processing in the Second-tier Southeast Asian Newly Industrializing Countries. (with Michael Rock) (1998)Growth After The Asian Crisis: What Remains of the East Asian Model? (2001)Globalization, Liberalization and Equitable Development: Lessons from East Asia. (2003)Deforesting Malaysia: The Political Economy and Social Ecology of Agricultural Expansion and Commercial Logging. (with Chang Y. T., Khoo K. J. and others) (2004)M Way: Mahathir's Economic Legacy. (2004)Malaysian "Bail-Outs"? Capital Controls, Restructuring & Recovery in Malaysia. (with Wong Sook Ching and Chin Kok Fay) (2005)
Law, Institutions and Malaysian Economic Development. (with Wong Sau Ngan) (2008)
Labour Market Segmentation in Malaysian Services. (with H. L. Khong) (2010)
Malaysia@50: Economic Development, Distribution, Disparities. (with Wee Chong Hui) (2014)

Edited volumes
Development in the Eighties. (with H. Osman Rani and Ishak Shari) (1981)
The Malaysian Economy and Finance. (with Sritua Arief) (1983)
ASEAN Economies: Crisis and Response. (1985)
Crisis and Response in the Malaysian Economy. (1987)
Child Labour in Malaysia. (1992)
Islamic Economic Alternatives: Critical Perspectives and New Directions. (1992)
Industrialising Malaysia: Performance, Problems, Prospects. (1993)
Privatizing Malaysia: Rents, Rhetoric, Realities. (1995)
Malaysia's Economic Development: Policy & Reform. (with Ng Suew Kiat) (1996)
Capital, the State and Late Industrialization in East Asia. (with John Borrego and Alejandro Alvarez Bejar) (1996)
Tigers in Trouble: Financial Governance, Liberalisation and Crises in East Asia. (1998)
Industrial Policy in East Asia. (with Tan Kock Wah) (1999)
Technology, Competitiveness and the State: Malaysia's Industrial Technology Policies. (with Greg Felker) (1999)
Rents, Rent-Seeking and Economic Development: Theory and the Asian Evidence. (with Mushtaq Khan) (2000)
Malaysian Eclipse: Economic Crisis and Recovery. (2001)
Reinventing Malaysia: Reflections on Its Past and Future. (2001)
Globalization Versus Development: Heterodox Perspectives. (with Shyamala Nagaraj) (2001)
Southeast Asia's Industrialization: Industrial Policy, Capabilities and Sustainability. (2001)
Ugly Malaysians? South–South Investments Abused. (2002)
Southeast Asia's Paper Tigers: From Miracle to Debacle and Beyond. (2003)
Manufacturing Miracles: How Internationally Competitive National Firms and Industries Developed in East Asia. (2003)
Globalisation and Its Discontents, Revisited. (with K. J. Khoo) (2003)
Ethnic Business Chinese Capitalism in Southeast Asia. (with Brian Folk) (2003)
After The Storm: Crisis, Recovery and Sustaining Development in East Asia. (2004)
The New Development Economics. (with Ben Fine) (2005)
The Origins of Development Economics. (with Erik Reinert) (2005)
Pioneers of Development Economics. (2005)
The Long Twentieth Century – Globalization Under Hegemony: The Changing World Economy. (2006)
The Long Twentieth Century – The Great Divergence: Hegemony, Uneven Development and Global Inequality. (2006)
Malaysian Industrial Policy. (2007)
Policy Matters: Economic and Social Policies to Sustain Equitable Development. (with Jose Antonio Ocampo) (2007)
Flat World, Big Gaps: Economic Liberalization, Globalization, Poverty and Inequality. (2007)
Growth Divergences: Explaining Differences in Economic Performance. (with Jose Antonio Ocampo and Robert Vos) (2007)
Towards Full and Decent Employment. (with Jose Antonio Ocampo) (2007)
Reforming the International Financial System for Development. (2011)
Poor Poverty. (with Anis Chowdhury) (2011)
Good Governance For What?. (with Anis Chowdhury) (2012)

References

External links
KS Jomo's website

Living people
1952 births
People from Penang
Malaysian people of Indian descent
Malaysian officials of the United Nations
Malaysian economists
Academic staff of the University of Malaya
Cornell University faculty
Harvard University faculty
Harvard Kennedy School alumni
Yale University alumni
Yale University faculty